CyberPowerPC, also known as CyberPower, is an American personal computer retailer. It specializes in building and selling a wide range of (custom-built) gaming computers. It also has a presence in television broadcasting.

Business
CyberPowerPC was founded and incorporated on February 17, 1998, in the City of Industry, California, with the launch of its first channel, Koala Network.

In 2003, the company was listed as the fastest growing privately owned business in the Los Angeles area by the Los Angeles Business Journal.

From 2011 to 2016, CyberPowerPC has been consistently ranked within the top 150 largest privately owned companies headquartered in Los Angeles County by the Los Angeles Business Journal.

Products 
CyberPowerPC produces and sells PCs primarily for use in computer gaming. Their products feature third-party components prepared into the complete ready-to break
packages. CyberPowerPC offers the option to users to choose their custom components for building PC.

Desktop PCs 
With the advent of VR gaming in 2014, CyberPowerPC, with support from Oculus VR, released the most inexpensive computer capable of running the Oculus Rift virtual reality system, according to Oculus CEO Brendan Iribe. Later, CyberPowerPC became notable for developing a PC build for the express purpose of streaming video games.

All desktops released by the company are built to user specifications with several pre-selected builds available. In general, these computers are not given a model name (contrary to laptops) due to the variable nature of each design. CyberPowerPC, however, offers many exclusive series, such as Elgato Stream Machine or Luxe, that range anywhere from one to eight thousand US Dollars.

Laptops 
CyberPowerPC laptops fall under the 'Tracer' series. As of 2021, all CyberPowerPC laptops use Intel Core and AMD Ryzen CPUs and Nvidia GeForce GPUs.

Models 
 Tracer III (Low Tier)—a laptop thin-and-light that features previous-generation graphics cards as well as previous-generation locked CPUs.
 Tracer IV (Mid Tier)—a gaming laptop that features previous-generation discrete graphics cards and locked CPUs.
 Tracer V (High Tier)—a gaming laptop that features high-end mobile graphics cards and high performance CPUs.

Gaming consoles 
In 2014, CyberPowerPC released a Steam Machine designed to compete with the Xbox One and PlayStation 4 platforms.

Television division 

CyberPowerTelevision was an American media conglomerate. It was America's longest company in the City of Industry. CyberPowerTelevision also had a presence in out-of-home advertising.

On February 1, 2023, as part of CyberPowerPC's confirm in television business, the CyberPowerTelevision assests were split up to form Rogers Television Networks.

History 
The company was founded in 1998. Its first channel was Koala Network.

In 2000, the company founded CyberPowerOutdoor, an out-of-home company. It operates transit shelter and billboard manufactoring.

In 2012, the company satrted to air its end tag at the end of series on its channels. In 2013, the company added its trademark 4-note whistling mnemonic tune at the end of each series of its channels.

On May 2, 2021, CyberPowerTelevision acquired MarbleMedia's stake in the former children's television service MarbleKids, changed the channel's name to GTV, and converted it into an ad-supported service. GTV operated under the GeforceGTX liscene. The CRTC revoked MarbleKids' liscene on June 7, 2021.

On March 24, 2022, it was announced that CyberPowerTelevision would be split up form Rogers Television Networks, in an attempt to relieve concerns surrounding Rogers' total market share in its television services. This required CRTC approval. The split was cancelled on October 25, 2022.

On January 24, 2023, it was announced that CyberPowerTelevision would be split up to form Rogers Television networks for the second time; it was also announced that it would shut down GTV on February 3, with the CRTC revoking GTV's liscene. At the CRTC's request, the company was split up on February 1, 2023. Despite the split, CyberPowerPC continues to do out-of-home business today.

Channels

Entertainment 
 Koala Network — a drama-oriented television channel dedicated to performing arts and independent film aimed at family audiences.
 Travel and Action — channel focused on travel and action programming.
 The Comedy Channel — a male-oriented channel airing stand-up comedy, sketch comedy and sitcoms.

Other 
 Teletour — originally called Prime in 1998 and later TVMania in 2006 before adopting the current name, a television channel that airs religion-related programming, and originally aired classic shows from 60's to 80's when it launched in 1998 until 2013.
 HistoryCase — a historical-focused channel and website.
 International — a television channel that is CyberPowerPC's answer to The CW, NBC, ABC, Fox and PBS.
 If I... — originally called BioTV in 2005 before adopting the current name in 2015, a female-oriented channel which primarily broadcasts do-it-yourself programming.
 Lighter — a pay-per-view channel that airs feature films and is an American version of Viewers Choice.
 MAD TV — a television channel based on the Mad magazine.
 Female — a female-oriented channel airing teen dramas.
 GameTV — formerly known as New Gaming Network in 2007 until 2008, a television channel broadcasting family-oriented general entertainment and is the American version of GameTV.
 GM24 – originally known as GamingPlus24 from its launch in 1998 until 2013, a comedy-oriented television channel, and it was well known in its early years for airing gaming and game show programming.
 DivaTV — a reality and lifestyle television network.
 ComicTelevision — a television channel that airs movies based on comic books.
 Five America — a television channel that usually airs technology programming and is the American version of BBC Canada.
 GM64 — a sister station to GM24.
 Editors Choice — a sister station to The Comedy Channel.

Defunct 
 GTV — also known as Gaming Television, a teen-oriented gaming channel that also broadcast general entertainment programming.

CyberPowerPC also owned a production division called CyberPowerMedia, which planned to work with PlayStation and Xbox along with Nintendo, and GTV was to air shows commissioned for and aired on CMT.

eSports 
CyberPowerPC participates in the esports form of competitive gameplay by sponsoring and hosting occasional tournaments, such as its Summer 2016 Pro CS:GO Series. Notable eSports team Team SoloMid is sponsored by the business. Additionally, the company sells several lines of custom PC builds designed for eSports.

References 

Computer companies of the United States
Computer hardware companies